The Steve Earle Show (formerly known as The Revolution Starts Now) was a weekly radio show on the Air America Radio network hosted by singer/songwriter Steve Earle. It highlighted some of Earle's favorite artists, blending in-studio performances with liberal political talk and commentary.

The show aired Sundays on some Air America affiliates from 10 to 11 PM ET.

The show last aired on June 10, 2007, and that was a rebroadcast of a past episode. Earle subsequently started DJing on a show on Sirius Satellite Radio called Hardcore Troubadour.

References

External links 
 Official show site

Air America (radio network)
American music radio programs